Bad Compilation Tapes / Borderless Countries Tapes is an independent punk/hardcore music label founded in 1982 by Chris Chacon and Dave W. in San Diego, California. The label, with a declared DIY ethic, published from 1981 to 1986 twenty-seven compilations on cassette involving 149 groups from 17 countries. It still sold tapes until around the year 2000, but it made the last 2 tapes of the 27 in 1986. It is considered one of the labels that contributed most to the spread of the European hardcore punk scene in North America. All BCT tapes are available on Anarcho-Punk.net-Crust Punk Community & Music Download for free download.

History of BCT

1982-1986: Bad Compilation Tapes

In 1982 BCT published an announcement on the 8th issue of Maximumrocknroll asking punk groups to send their compositions to them. The announcement was then reprinted in several European magazines and the Italian fanzines TVOR and Attack Punkzine, which contributed a lot to the internationalization of the label. BCT placed a small personal ad in Rockerilla, the most important alternative music magazine in Italy at the time. Syd Migx, the frontman of CCM (Cheetah Chrome Motherfuckers), responded to it asking the Italian Roberto Schiavo, founder of the F.O.G. (Flowers of Grain Records), to send tapes of Italian punk bands to BCT which he did. From those tapes the label made its first Italian compilation tapes. 
The first tape of the label, titled First Strike, included bands from the US such as Clitboys, Future Ruins, Violation, Vatican Commandos (with a very young Moby on guitar), Mr. Epp & The Calculations (the band of Mark Arm and Steve Turner, which later became Green River and then Mudhoney), Skoundrelz (the band of famous skater Tony Alva) and Eat The Rich, while the second tape Music On Fire featured bands from the Italian punk scene such as 5° Braccio, Raw Power, Indigesti, Wretched, Stazione Suicida, Crash Box and Rappresaglia. 
The 22nd tape is dedicated to the rising Spanish punk/hardcore scene

The BCT logo was a character called Moe Hawk drawn in black and white by Dan, the singer of Eat the Rich from San Jose. Craig Caron, the founder of Schizophrenic Records, colored the image and used it to release the vinyl version of the BCT # 18 tape: Thrash, Therefore I Am.

The two tapes were followed by other releases featuring many bands from around the world: the Finns Rattus and Terveet Kädet, the Danish Razor Blades and Disrespect, the Swedes Mob 47, Product Assar, Moderat Likvidation and Anti Cimex, the Germans Äni(X)Väx and Kanalkotzer, the Australians Vicious Circle and the Canadians The Bill Of Rights were just some of the many acts included on the international productions of the BCT label.

Between 1986 and 1987 the publication also extended to other formats under the name of BC Tapes & Records, whose first release was a compilation on LP entitled We Can Do Whatever We Want (International Comp.) which saw a mix of European and American bands and was a best of the first 11 tapes.

2002s: Reprints and new publications

In 2002 the label re-issued five cds and one lp of 7 of BCT tapes. BCT worked with a consortium of labels for those re-issues: Enterruption of San Francisco, Human Stench of Pittsfield, MA and Schizophrenic Records of Hamilton, Canada who did 2 releases each in conjunction with BCT. Among these reprints there was Senza Tregua: Granducato Hardcore (2002), an album that for the new edition commissioned the cover of the album to Winston Smith, the historical author of the Dead Kennedys logo and album covers.

BCT and Italy

In 1984 Chris Chacon reconfirmed his interest in the Italian scene by first releasing cassette releases by Raw Power titled Studio + Live and then the two Last White Christmas tapes, recordings of the LWC event held on December 4, 1983 in Pisa Italy by the punk cooperative called G.D.H.C.. In the same year, some Italian fanzines began to call the label Borderless Countries Tapes, a name that was officially adopted and added to the original name. The name came from the suggestion of an Italian punk fan via mail.

BCT and tours of Italian bands in the USA

Following the Raw Power release, Chris Chacon organized a tour of the band, which was also the first tour of an Italian hardcore punk band in the United States. During the tour, that included 32 shows in 40 days, Raw Power played at the Olympic Auditorium in Los Angeles with the Dead Kennedys in front of more than 5,000 people. It was in those days that the independent label Toxic Shock Records of Pomona, California came forward for the release of the second Raw Power album Screams From The Gutter, which was recorded in Indianapolis near the end of the tour, at Paul Mahern's (of Zero Boys) studio in just a day and a half. The album was released in 1985 and sold more than 40,000 copies via independent channels. In the same period BCT published Live in the USA, a cassette with all the best songs recorded on tour (selected from 15 tapes of 20 concerts).

In the autobiographical novel by Silvio Bernelli entitled I ragazzi del Mucchio, the bassist of Declino, Negazione and Indigesti describes the US tour of the latter, organized and promoted by BCT in 1986 
. The label, for the occasion, also produced the EP on 7" vinyl The Sand Through the Green. The tour, which lasted 40 days with 20 concerts, departed from Philadelphia and ended up in San Francisco, touching also St. George in Utah with the very young NOFX, who had just released their second album.

BCT and LWC35
In December 2018 the 35th anniversary of Last White Christmas was celebrated with the LWC35 concert in the historic Lumiere cinema of Pisa, the first cinema to be opened in Italy (1899). In the cinema hall there was an exhibition of 35 posters made by Italian and international graphic designers and illustrators for the 35th anniversary of the concert. Among the artists who participated with their own work created for the 35th anniversary of the concert there were: Winston Smith, Craig Henning, John Yarbrough (designer of the cover of the first concert release on cassettes), Tuono Pettinato, Vittore Baroni, Giuseppe Palumbo and Prof.Bad Trip. The official poster of the LWC35 festival was designed by Danijel Žeželj.
In June 2020 an Italian record company reprinted the Last White Christmas concert thanks to the granting of free reprint rights by Chris Chacon of BCT.

Some bands released by BCT

From USA
Vatican Commandos 
White Flag 
The Accüsed 
Happy Flowers
Mr. Epp and the Calculations
Skoundrelz
White Flag
Disorderly Conduct
Deranged Diction

From Australia
Vicious Circle

From Italy
Cheetah Chrome Motherfuckers
Wretched 
Raw Power 
Not Moving
I Refuse It!
Indigesti
Nabat

From Spain
RIP 
Último Resorte
Frenopaticss
Anti/Dogmatikss

From Germany
Äni(X)Väx
Kanalkotzer

From Finland
Kaaos
Rattus 
Terveet Kädet

From Canada
The Bill Of Rights

From Sweden
Mob 47 
Moderat Likvidation
Anti Cimex

From Norway
Akutt Innleggelse

From Denmark
The Razor Blades
Disrespect

From Brazil
Cólera 
Inocentes
Ratos de Porão

From Holland
Funeral Oration

From England
Xpozez

References

Bibliography
 p. 82
 p. 481

 pp. 219, 221 and 222

 pp. 119 and 153

 pp. 43, 94, 164-165 and 174
 pp. 374, 390, 393 and 398
 p. 216
 pp. 162–164

 pp. 70–72
 p. 192

Documentary

External links
BCT reviews on MMR 

American independent record labels
American record labels
Alternative rock record labels
Hardcore record labels
Punk record labels
Record labels established in 1982